Stockholm Finance Ltd v Garden Holdings Inc [1995] is an English land law case, concerning the meaning of actual occupation for the purpose of overriding interests in registered land.

Facts
The claimant lender sent notices, followed correct procedure and sued for possession as its secured loan demanded actual occupation. The Saudi Princess, occupying the property through an arrangement with the defendant company, claimed she had been in actual occupation of a house, retained clothing, furniture and caretaking arrangements in place,. She sought that the orders should be reversed.

The claimant plead the Princess's admittance of not being in the home for more than a year and having only been intermittently resident before.

Judgment
The Judge held she was not in occupation of her London house chiefly because she had not been in it for fourteen months up until and including the point of inspection.

A court would decide on whether a person's intermittent presence was being "in actual occupation" of a house (that is specifically "whether a person’s intermittent presence at a house which is fully furnished, and ready for almost immediate use, should be seen as continuous occupation marked (but not interrupted) by occasional absences, or whether...a pattern of alternating periods of presence and absence").

This is:
...a matter of perception which defies deep analysis. Not only the length of any absence, but also the reason for it, may be material (a holiday or a business trip may be easier to reconcile with continuing and unbroken occupation than a move to a second home, even though the duration is the same in each case). But there must come a point at which a person’s absence from his house is so prolonged that the notion of his continuing to be in actual occupation of it becomes insupportable; and in my judgment that point must have been reached in this case, long before Mr Dawkins visited the house on 4 January 1990...By then Princess Madawi had not set foot in the property for over a year: she had for over a year been living with her mother in the Islamic household at Riyadh.’

See also
English land law
English property law

References

English land case law
1995 in case law
1995 in British law